WTA 125 tournaments are an international series of professional women's tennis tournaments organized by the Women's Tennis Association since 2012.

In the past (2012–2015) sometimes called the WTA Challenger series (analogous to the men's ATP Challenger Series) it is the second highest level of women's competition, right below the top-tier WTA Tour, and just above the ITF Women's Circuit tournaments. Players who succeed in the WTA 125s earn sufficient ranking points to become eligible for the main draw or qualifying draw entry of WTA Tour tournaments. Titles and losses at a WTA 125 event are separately counted from a player's WTA Tour results and corresponding head-to-head statistics.

Tournament locations
 Andorra : Andorra la Vella (2022–) 
 Argentina : Buenos Aires (2021–) 
 Canada : Vancouver (2022–) 
 Chile : Colina (2022–)
 China : Anning (2018–2019), Dalian (2015–2017), Nanchang (2014–2015), Nanjing (2013), Ningbo (2013–2014), Suzhou (2013–2014), Zhengzhou (2017–2018)
 Colombia : Cali (2013, 2023–)
 Croatia : Bol (2016–2019, 2021), Makarska (2022–) 
 Czech Republic : Prague (2020)
 France : Angers (2021–), Contrexéville (2022–), Limoges (2014–2019, 2021–), Paris (2022–), Rouen (2022–), Saint-Malo (2021–) 
 Germany : Karlsruhe (2019, 2021–2022)
 Hungary : Budapest (2022–) 
 India : Pune (2012), Mumbai (2017–2018)
 Italy : Bari (2022–), Gaiba (2022–), Florence (2023–)
 Mexico : Guadalajara (2019), San Luis Potosí (2023–), Tampico (2022–) 
 Romania : Bucharest (2022–), Iași (2022–)
 Serbia : Belgrade (2021) 
 South Korea : Seoul (2021) 
 Spain : La Bisbal d'Empordà (2023–), Marbella (2022), Reus (2023–), Valencia (2022–)
 Sweden : Båstad (2019, 2021–)
 Taiwan : Taipei (2012–2019)
 Thailand : Hua Hin (2015, 2017)
 United States : Carlsbad (2015), Charleston (2021), Chicago (2018, 2021), Columbus (2021), Concord (2021–), Honolulu (2016–2017), Houston (2018–2019), Indian Wells (2018–2020), Midland (2021–), New Haven (2019), Newport Beach (2018–2020), San Antonio (2016)
 Uruguay : Montevideo (2021–)

Historic names

2012–2020
WTA 125K series

2021–present
WTA 125

Prize money
The tournaments offer total prize money of $125,000–$162,480. An exception was made in case of 2020 Advantage Cars Prague Open which had a prize money of $3,125,000 which was funded by 2020 US Open organizers to make up for the lack of a qualifying draw as many low ranked players, mainly from Europe were unable to travel to New York due to COVID-19 pandemic. Hospitality in these tournaments is included automatically.

Points distribution

Singles champions

WTA 125K Series

WTA 125

Competed under no flag due to the Russian invasion of Ukraine.

Records

Most titles by player

|

Most finals by player

|

Youngest champions
Singles

Doubles

Oldest champions
Singles

Doubles

Others
Highest ranked players to win a singles title

Highest ranked players to win a doubles title

Lowest ranked players to win a singles title

Lowest ranked players to win a doubles title

Most titles by nation

|

Notes

± Titles won by Russian athletes were not counted in their official tally since 1 March 2022 due to Russian Invasion of Ukraine.

 updated as of 19 December 2022

See also
 WTA Tour
 ITF Women's World Tennis Tour
 ATP Challenger Tour
 ATP 125 tournaments

References

 
Women's tennis tournaments
Tennis tours and series
Women's Tennis Association
Recurring sporting events established in 2012
Recurring sporting events disestablished in 2020